The State Register of Heritage Places is maintained by the Heritage Council of Western Australia. , 100 places are heritage-listed in the Shire of Derby-West Kimberley, of which 20 are on the State Register of Heritage Places.

List
The Western Australian State Register of Heritage Places, lists the following 20 state registered places within the Shire of Derby-West Kimberley:

References

Derby
 
Derby